The 2016 Major League Ultimate season was the fourth and final season for the frisbee league. The eight teams were split into two regional conferences (East and West), with each team playing a 10-game schedule, including some cross-divisional matches. The top two teams in each conference advanced to the next round, where they competed against the other qualified team from their conference. The winners of these matches advanced to the final to compete for the MLU Championship. On July 16, Philadelphia Spinners won the final 14–11 against Portland Stags to become the 2016 MLU Champions.

Standings
Eastern Conference

Western Conference

Postseason

Source:

Conference Finals

MLU Championship

Season Awards

Most Valuable Players
Billy Sickles and Cody Bjorklund were voted for as the MVPs for their respective conferences.

Eastern Conference

Western Conference

Spirit Awards
Quinn Hunziker (New York Rumble) and Clay Dewey-Valentine (Seattle Rainmakers) were voted for by the other players as the most spirited within their conferences. This award was given based on their sportsmanship both on and off the pitch.

Rookies of the Year
This award was given for the players who had the best season as a first-year player. Graeme Barber (Vancouver Nighthawks) and Sean Mott (New York Rumble) won the award for their respective conference.

Eastern Conference

Western Conference

Breakout Player of the Year
This award was awarded to Raphy Hayes (Portland Stags) as the player who made the most improvement compared to the previous season.

Offensive Players of the Year
This award was given to the best offensive player in each conference. Brad Houser (Seattle Rainmakers) and Delrico Johnson (DC Current) were the two winners of the award.

Eastern Conference

Western Conference

Defensive Players of the Year
This award was given to the best defensive player in each conference. Marques Brownlee (New York Rumble) and Peter Woodside (Portland Stags) were the two winners of the award.

Eastern Conference

Western Conference

Coaches of the Year
This award was given to the coach in each conference who surpassed their goals throughout the season. It was awarded to Danny Quarrell (Portland Stags) and Darryl Stanley (Philadelphia Spinners) who both took their teams to the final of the competition, losing only one conference match each.

See also
2016 American Ultimate Disc League season

References

Major League Ultimate